Loredana Bujor-van Egmond (born 23 June 1972) is a professional Romanian retired tennis player who played for the Romania Fed Cup team. On 10 December 1990, she reached her highest WTA singles ranking of 325 whilst her best doubles ranking was 366 on 1 April 1991.

References

External links
 
 
 

1972 births
Living people
Romanian female tennis players